Miloje Šarčević (born 17 February 1993) is a Serbian football midfielder who plays for FK Grafičar Beograd

References

External links
 
 Profile at FK Javor Official website

1993 births
Living people
People from Ivanjica
Association football midfielders
Serbian footballers
FK Javor Ivanjica players
Serbian SuperLiga players